Mark Jenkins may refer to:
 Mark Jenkins (artist) (born 1970), American artist
 Mark Jenkins (musician) (born 1960), British musician and music writer
 Mark Jenkins (actor) (born 1943), American actor